For the Eurovision Song Contest 1999, Malta entered "Believe 'n peace", performed by Times Three.

Before Eurovision

Malta Song for Europe 1999 
The final was held on 19 and 20 February 1999 at the Mediterranean Conference Centre in Valletta, hosted by Mariella Scerri and Joseph Chetcuti. 16 songs competed, and the winner was decided by an "expert" jury – one of whom was Mojca Mavec, the presenter of the Slovene national selection for 1999.

Georgina and Paul Giordimaina represented Malta in 1991, and Georgina was also a backing singer in 1996. Claudette Pace would go on to represent the country in 2000. Fabrizio Faniello would follow suit in both 2001 and 2006, and Olivia Lewis would do the same in 2007.

At Eurovision
The song received 32 points, finishing 15th.

Voting

References

1999
Countries in the Eurovision Song Contest 1999
Eurovision